Yaroslav Yeromenko (born 20 January 1989), better known as DJ JARR, is a Ukrainian DJ, music producer and remixer from Kramatorsk.

Early life 
Yeromenko was born on January 20, 1989, in Kramatorsk. His father Yeromenko Oleg was general director of the Star Kramatorsk machine-building plant, and deputy of Kramatorsk City Council. Yeromenko's father taught him love to music. Yeromenko went to music school to study guitar, but he did not finish his studies. 

At age 16, he went to England where he studied English. He lived in Brighton where he became interested of electronic music, clubs and nightlife. After returning to Ukraine, he began play electronic music. 

He became a DJ at the main disco of Kramatorsk. In 2007 Yeromenko went to Kyiv to enter Shevchenko University, as his family advised him, but eventually chose the Kyiv Institute of International Relations. The 17th of April  2007 year, Yeromenko's father died  in a car accident. Yeromenko returned to Kramatorsk after his father's death. He transfer to the Donbass Machine-building Academy and to become an engineer, and then worked as a sales manager of the Energomashspetsstal factory.

Arrest 
Yeromenko bought a console, controllers and acted at home closed parties in Kramatorsk. He decided to start a business in Svyatogorsk. He worked in marketing communications, especially digital-technology. On 27 April 2014 Yeromenko was stopped by the armed formations of the self-proclaimed DPR at a roadblock on the Kramatorsk-Svyatogorsk road near Sloviansk. In the trunk of his car the guards found a fan scarf of the Ukraine national football team and photos with the flag of Ukraine in his phone.  Yeromenko had never taking an active part in politics. In spite of this, the guards suspected Yeromenko of connections with the Right Sector. He was declared an "enemy of the republic" and sentenced to immediate execution. However, this decision was later canceled. It was decided to send Yeromenko to Slavyansk for further clarification. He was tortured and beaten and forced to shout "Glory to Ukraine" and sing the national anthem of Ukraine.

"Especially, I was tortured because I being a local and do not support the new regime. The blue and yellow scarf found in the trunk was tied round my neck and the warders passing by me periodically choked me to them."

In the basement of the SBU building in Slavyansk, Yeromenko was in the same cell with stage-manager Pavel Yurov and artist Denis Grischuk. They were tortured and beaten. Thanks to the efforts of Yeromenko's mother, he managed to free himself from captivity. On 1 May 2014, after spending four days in the basement, he was released. His car was confiscated in favor of the self-proclaimed  Donetsk People's Republic. After his release, he was taken beyond the roadblock, a bandage was removed from his eyes, and he was ordered to go without turning around. Enterprises belonging to his family were looted. Warehouses that Eremenko rented were cut to scrap metal.

Career 
After his release, Yeromenko left Kramatorsk and went to his relatives in Dnipropetrovsk, and from there to Kyiv. After return to Kyiv, he decided to become a professional musician. He stated, 

"All these crazy experiences helped me to realize the value of each day of our short and such a fragile life. Now I really care about every hour I've been given».
«I dreamed of doing music all my life - doubts, the belief that there are ways «right» and "wrong" before all these events kept me from the employment that I dreamed of doing. A senseless bloody war every day takes the lives of young, talented people who had something to say to this world. I narrowly escaped  their fate, and now I have no right to miss my chance to make this world a little better."

He uses the techniques of musical groups such as Innervisions, Slowdance, Dixon and AME. In 2014 he organized a series of parties and auto-party on Vozdvizhenka in Kyiv, in the art space Sugar Package. He became acquainted with the producers of The Lab. After these parties, he was invited to the nightclub of The Lab, where they conducted a series of auto-parties, working with Dj Pitchboy. At one of the parties in The Lab where Eremenko worked, a silent Ukrainian film was shown. Yeromenko was offered the change to write music that would accompany the display of old paintings and newsreels. After that, he was invited by the National Oleksandr Dovzhenko Film Centre to create soundtracks for silent Ukrainian films of the middle and the end of the twentieth century. Together with Anton Baybakov he worked on the soundtrack to the film Dziga Vertova Eleventh. 

He graduated from Kyiv Academy of Media Arts, majoring in Digital Film. Together with Pavel Yurov, whom Eremenko had met while in captivity, they worked on a semi-documentary under the working title Je suis Donbass. The scenario included events that occurred during their arrival in the ATO zone in 2014. According to the writers, half of the film describes Yurov and half Yeromenko. 

Yeromenko worked with producer Sergey Dotsenko and with Kalina Music.  Yeromenko is the producer of the "JARR" projects for Packed Promo Group. He works with the Art-factory llatform and Ukrainian artist Masha Zolotova. Yeromenko is not married.

References

External links
 Official blog of Eremenko Yeromenko Olegovich
 Official page on Facebook Eremenko Yeromenko Olegovich
 Official page of DJ JARR

1989 births
Living people
People from Kramatorsk
Ukrainian DJs
Eurodance musicians
Ukrainian prisoners and detainees
Ukrainian prisoners of war
Ukrainian victims of human rights abuses
Ukrainian torture victims
Ukrainian people taken hostage
2014 controversies
Electronic dance music DJs